Betcher is a ghost town in Green Meadow Township, Norman County, in the U.S. state of Minnesota.

History
Betcher was begun as a small village at around 1900 by Arthur H. Betcher. A post office was established at Betcher in 1902, and remained in operation until it was discontinued in 1907.

References

Ghost towns in Minnesota
Geography of Norman County, Minnesota